The Jacques Saadé class is a group of nine container ships each with a capacity of 23,000 TEUs built by the China State Shipbuilding Corporation (CSSC) for French shipping company CMA CGM. Construction on the first two began in July 2018 in Shanghai by Jiangnan Shipyard and Hudong-Zhonghua Shipbuilding. The first ship was launched in September 2019. The first ship was delivered on 22 September 2020. The first two ships were originally expected to be delivered in 2019,  but they have been delivered in September and October 2020  after a delay of at least 10 months by China State Shipbuilding Corporation (CSSC).

History
CSSC and CMA CGM signed a contract to produce the ships on 19 September 2017. The value of the contract was worth an estimated USD 1.2 billion at the time. 

Construction of the first two ships began on 26 July 2018. The first ship, CMA CGM Jacques Saadé, named after the founder of CMA CGM Jacques Saadé, was launched in September 2019. The first ship was originally expected to be delivered in November 2019,  but it was delivered on 22 September 2020  after a delay of at least 10 months by China State Shipbuilding Corporation (CSSC).  The second ship CMA CGM Champs Elysees was delivered on 27 October 2020 after a delay of at least 10 months. The ships are registered in Marseille.

List of ships

Specifications
They will each have a deadweight tonnage capacity of 220,000 DWT.

The engines will be fueled by liquefied natural gas (LNG). The decision to use LNG as a fuel is in anticipation of the upcoming 2020 IMO regulation limiting sulfur emissions.

See also 

 Antoine de Saint Exupery-class container ship
 Explorer-class container ship
 Argentina-class container ship
 A. Lincoln-class container ship

References

External links
 Image

Container ship classes
Ships of CMA CGM